Marlands Works was a busy industrial site for just over a century, firstly on the Torrington and Marland Railway, built to carry bricks and clay on a three-feet gauge, which in turn was  subsumed  in 1925 by the North Devon and Cornwall Junction Light Railway before finally becoming part of the Southern Region of British Railways in 1948. The line closed to passenger traffic in 1965 as part of the Beeching reforms but the line remained open for freight between Barnstaple railway station and Torrington until 1982. Today it forms part of the popular Tarka trail, although an important site for industrial railway historians too.
Marland Works station was used by workmen only and was not in public passenger use.

See also 

List of closed railway stations in Britain

References

External links
The Colonel Stephens Society

Disused railway stations in Devon
Torridge District